Ainhoa Goñi Blanco (born 7 August 1979) is a former professional tennis player from Spain.

Goñi won six singles titles and one doubles title on the ITF Circuit in her career. On 5 November 2001, she reached her best singles ranking of world No. 140. On 4 December 2000, she peaked at No. 222 in the doubles rankings.

She made her WTA Tour main-draw debut at the 2001 Copa Colsanitas, in the doubles event partnering Nuria Llagostera Vives, after coming through the qualifying rounds.

Goñi retired from professional tennis 2005.

ITF Circuit finals

Singles: 7 (6–1)

Doubles: 2 (1–1)

External links
 
 

Living people
1976 births
Spanish female tennis players
Tennis players from Madrid
Sportspeople from Pamplona